Life 102: What to Do When Your Guru Sues You is a book by Peter McWilliams. Couched in the tone of the author's Life 101 self-help books, it levels a series of allegations against John-Roger (Roger Delano Hinkins), founder of the Movement of Spiritual Inner Awareness (MSIA) and Insight Seminars.

These allegations caused the book, self-published in 1994 under McWilliams' Prelude Press imprint, to itself become the subject of litigation for libel. John-Roger bought the publishing rights from McWilliams for $3 million dollars and quickly ceased publication. The remaining copies were withdrawn from sale. The volume discusses in detail McWilliams's own experiences over a 15-year period:

McWilliams describes his struggle with depression, and claims that Hinkins promised him "spiritual healing" in exchange for crediting "John-Roger" as co-author of a series of self-improvement manuals which later made the New York Times best-seller lists.

Hinkins sued McWiliams for libel. They settled out of court with Hinkins buying the publishing rights for $3 million dollars. The volume has been out of print ever since. David C. Lane, a professor of at Mt. San Antonio College, California assisted McWilliams by providing him with research material on various religions, including Lane's own dissertation thesis. In exchange McWilliams agreed to make available free a copy of his book for non-commercial purposes on Prof. Lane's website, The Neural Surfer. After securing the rights Hinkins sued Prof. Lane in order to force him to take down the last available copy of Life 102.
Peter McWilliams, at that time dying of AIDS and in federal prison for the use of medical marijuana, was disregarded as a witness and the court ruled in favour of Hinkins. The court ordered Lane to pay Hinkins legal fees. Lane bluffed that he was planning to write a follow up book, Life 103: John-Roger against me. Hinkins soon agreed to pay the costs himself:

References

External links 
 MSIA v. David Christopher Lane, Opinion of August 19, 1998 and Judgment of September 1, 1998

Movement of Spiritual Inner Awareness
1994 non-fiction books
Books by Peter McWilliams
Recalled publications